The Three-striped butterflyfish (Chaetodon tricinctus) is a species of marine ray-finned fish, a butterflyfish belonging to the family Chaetodontidae. It is native to eastern Australia, Lord Howe Island and Norfolk Island in the Tasman Sea. This species reaches a maximum length of  TL.

References

Chaetodon
Fish described in 1901